L'Avenir is a daily newspaper published in Kinshasa in the Democratic Republic of the Congo.  The company is part of the Groupe L'Avenir, a media group of the DRC. The content of the paper is primarily French, and includes content written in Lingala and Swahili.  It was founded in 1996 as a weekly, and in 2006 became a daily paper, employing about 300 journalists.

The publisher of L'Avenir is Joachim Diana Gikupa and the editor-in-chief is Denis Lubindi. 
L'Avenir Means "The Future"

See also
Radio Television Groupe Avenir
 Media of the Democratic Republic of the Congo

References

External links
  Le Groupe Avenir, the official site

French-language newspapers published in Africa
Kinshasa
Newspapers published in the Democratic Republic of the Congo
Newspapers established in 1996
Weekly newspapers
1996 establishments in Zaire